Timbre is the perceived sound quality of a musical note, sound or tone.

It may also refer to:
 Timbre (album), by Sophie B. Hawkins
 Timbres magazine, a philately magazine|
 Timbre Cierpke, an American musician and band